The 1918 Michigan gubernatorial election was held on November 5, 1918. Incumbent Republican Albert Sleeper defeated Democratic candidate John W. Bailey with 64.41% of the vote.

General election

Candidates
Major party candidates
Albert Sleeper, Republican
John W. Bailey, Democratic 
Other candidates
Ernest J. Moore, Socialist
John S. McColl, Prohibition
John Hinds, Socialist Labor

Results

References

1918
Michigan
Gubernatorial
November 1918 events